Ola, Texas may refer to:

 Ola, Texas, former name of Casa Linda Estates, Dallas
 Ola, Kaufman County, Texas, a community in eastern Texas

See also
 Ola (disambiguation)
 OLA (disambiguation)